Injaka Dam, also spelled Inyaka Dam is an earth-fill type dam located on the Ngwaritsane River, near Bushbuckridge, Mpumalanga, South Africa. It was established in 2001 and its primary purpose is to store water for irrigation use. The hazard potential of the dam has been ranked as high (3).

See also
List of reservoirs and dams in South Africa
List of rivers of South Africa

References 

 List of South African Dams from the Department of Water Affairs

Dams in South Africa
Dams completed in 2002
2002 establishments in South Africa
21st-century architecture in South Africa